Thalassiosira symmetrica is a species of marine centric diatoms. It differs with T. eccentrica in the value processes and distribution patterns. The latter species is more abundant in inshore waters, while T. symmetrica has been found in oceanic waters.

References

Further reading
Hasle, Grethe R., et al. Identifying marine diatoms and dinoflagellates. Academic Press, 1996. 
Tomas, Carmelo R., ed. Identifying marine phytoplankton. Access Online via Elsevier, 1997.

External links

AlgaeBase
WORMS entry

Thalassiosirales